was a medium tank of the Imperial Japanese Army in World War II. Like the Type 1 Chi-He, this tank was an improved version of the Type 97 Chi-Ha. It incorporated a Type 3 75 mm tank gun, one of the largest Japanese tank guns during the war.

The Chi-Nu did not see combat during the war. All produced units were retained for the defense of the Japanese Homeland in anticipation of an Allied invasion.

History and development
At the outbreak of the Pacific War, the Type 97 Chi-Ha medium tank and Type 95 Ha-Go light tank designs comprised the mainstay of the armored units of the Imperial Japanese Army. As the war progressed, these tanks started to face significant challenges posed by Allied tanks. In the Burma and  Philippines Campaigns, the firepower of the 57 mm cannon mounted on the Type 97 was proven to be insufficient against Allied tanks. The Imperial Japanese Army therefore developed the Type 1 47 mm tank gun, which used a lighter high-explosive round with greater armor penetrating power. This gun was mounted on Type 97 Shinhoto Chi-Ha and Type 1 Chi-He medium tanks.

At the later stages of the war, large numbers of American M4 Sherman tanks arrived at the front line and increased pressure on Japanese armored forces. The   decided to develop a new medium tank to counter the enemy threat as well as a replacement for the Type 97.

The Army Technical Bureau had been working on the Type 4 Chi-To medium tank as the counter to the M4 Sherman, but there were problems and delays in the program. As a result, a stopgap tank was required. The Type 3 medium tank Chi-Nu was developed to cope with the M4 Sherman. Development of the Type 3 Chi-Nu occurred in 1943. The low priority given to tank production meant that the Type 3 did not actually enter production until 1944, by which time raw materials were in very short supply, and in 1945 much of Japan's industrial infrastructure had been destroyed by American strategic bombing. This led to its production run being severely curtailed. Only a total of between 144 to 166 units were produced. The Type 3 Chi-Nu was the last tank that was fielded by the Imperial Japanese armed forces, and was still in production at the end of the war.

Design

Armor and protection
The Type 3 Chi-Nu retained the same chassis and suspension of the Type 1 Chi-He, but with the addition of an enlarged turret ring for the new large hexagonal gun turret with a commander's cupola. It was the last design based directly on Type 97 lineage. The thickest armor used was 50 mm on the front hull; it also had 25 mm on the turret, 25 mm on the sides and 20 mm on the rear deck.

Armament
The main armament of the Type 3 Chi-Nu was the 75 mm Type 3 tank gun. The gun could be elevated between -10 and +25 degrees. Secondary armament was a Type 97 machine gun.

Mobility
The Chi-Nu had the same engine as the Type 1 Chi-He, producing 240 hp and a top speed of 39 km/h.

Service record

The Type 3 Chi-Nu was allocated to the Japanese home islands to defend against the projected Allied Invasion. They were to be part of the "Mobile Shock Force" to be used for counter-attacks against the Allied invasion. As the surrender of Japan occurred before that invasion, the Type 3 was never used in combat operations. The 4th Tank Division based in Fukuoka on Kyushu had a "significant" number of the Type 3 Chi-Nu tanks produced at its depot by the end of the war.

Survivor
One surviving Type 3 medium tank is on display at the Japan Ground Self-Defense Force Military Ordnance Training School at Tsuchiura, Ibaraki, Japan.

Variants
Type 3 Chi-Nu Kai prototype/Chi-Nu II
A "modification plan" for the Chi-Nu was for it to be up gunned with the Type 5 75 mm tank gun (L/56.4) and a Type 4 Chi-To turret. The exact status on the progress of the Chi-Nu Kai prototype is unknown.

See also

Tanks of comparable role, performance, and era

 Argentine Nahuel DL 43
 Australian Sentinel
 British Cromwell
 Canadian Ram II
 German Panzer IV
 Hungarian Turán III
 Italian Carro Armato P 40
 Italian P43 (proposal)
 Romanian 1942 medium tank (proposal)
 Soviet T-34
 United States M4 Sherman

Notes

References

External links

Taki's Imperial Japanese Army Page - Akira Takizawa
History of War.org

Type 3 Chi-Nu
3 Chi-Nu
World War II medium tanks
Mitsubishi
Military vehicles introduced from 1940 to 1944